The Journal of Ethnopharmacology is a peer-reviewed medical journal covering the traditional medicinal use of plants and other substances. It is the official journal of the International Society for Ethnopharmacology. The journal is included in the Index Medicus (MEDLINE).

References

External links 
 
 International Society for Ethnopharmacology

Pharmacology journals
Elsevier academic journals
Publications established in 1979
English-language journals